1997 Júbilo Iwata season

Competitions

Domestic results

J.League

Emperor's Cup

J.League Cup

Player statistics

 † player(s) joined the team after the opening of this season.

Transfers

In:

Out:

Transfers during the season

In
Takanori Nunobe (from Verdy Kawasaki)
Alessandro Andrade de Oliveira (from Santos FC on August)

Out
Mabilia (on August)

Awards
J.League Most Valuable Player: Dunga
J.League Best XI: Tomoaki Ogami, Dunga, Hiroshi Nanami, Masashi Nakayama

References
J.LEAGUE OFFICIAL GUIDE 1997, 1997 
J.LEAGUE OFFICIAL GUIDE 1998, 1996 
J.LEAGUE YEARBOOK 1999, 1999 
 1997年 試合日程・結果 | ジュビロ磐田 Jubilo IWATA

Other pages
 J. League official site
 Júbilo Iwata official site

Jubilo Iwata
Júbilo Iwata seasons